Sorites may refer to:
 Polysyllogism, a chain of syllogisms
 Sorites paradox, also referred to as the paradox of the heap
 Sorites (journal), a philosophy journal edited by Lorenzo Peña
 Sorites (foram), a genus of foraminifera in family Soritidae